Miss International Hungary is a national beauty contest for Miss International pageant.

History
On August 12, 2011 Miss International Hungary pageant began, and crowned the first titleholder, Nóra Virágh. It was run under organizers Tamas Czegledi, Dr. Szabolcs Gall and Gabor Szilagyi. The winner of  Miss International Hungary was expected to be the Ambassador of Peace and Beauty of Hungary. Between 1991 and 2004, Hungarian delegates were appointed by Mr. Adam Fasy Management. Blanka Bakos is the last representative from that organization.

On December 17, 2013 Brigitta Ötvös was the first titleholder who placed in Top 5 of the Miss International 2013 pageant. This is the highest placement result in beauty pageant history for Hungary.

On May 16, 2015 Linda Szunai was appointed as Miss International Hungary by the Miss International Hungary Team.

This pageant is not related to Miss Universe Hungary or Miss World Hungary contests.

The 5th annual Miss International Hungary pageant was postponed for two months after Linda Szunai was appointed as Miss International Hungary 2015. The reigning title Miss International in fifth edition automatically competed in the 2016 Miss International beauty pageant.

Titleholders
Color key

References

External links 
 Official website
 Official Facebook page

Beauty pageants in Hungary
Recurring events established in 1991
Hungarian awards